Ragnvald Andreassen Tamber,  (10 April 1913 – 14 September 1973) was a Norwegian naval officer. He was highly decorated for his achievements during  World War II, and later Rear Admiral in the Royal Norwegian Navy.

He was decorated with the War Cross with Sword, the  St. Olav's Medal with Oak Branch, the British  Distinguished Service Cross and the Atlantic Star, and the American Legion of Merit.

References

1913 births
1973 deaths
People from Øvre Eiker
Royal Norwegian Navy personnel of World War II
Royal Norwegian Navy admirals
Recipients of the War Cross with Sword (Norway)
Recipients of the St. Olav's Medal with Oak Branch
Recipients of the Distinguished Service Cross (United Kingdom)
Foreign recipients of the Legion of Merit